Kirițescu is a Romanian language surname. Notable people with the surname include:

Alexandru Kirițescu (1888–1961), Romanian playwright
Constantin Kirițescu (1876–1965), Romanian zoologist, educator, and military historian

Romanian-language surnames